Te Kura Kaupapa Māori o Te Koutu is a co-educational Māori immersion school in Rotorua, New Zealand offering education within a unique Maori environment for Māori students from Year 1 to Year 13. Te Koutu students from year 1 - 13 learn Spanish as well as Māori and English.

History
Founded in 1993 the Kura's purpose was to serve the education of Te Arawa Māori students. The school first started as a limited school with two teachers and a roll of 20-30 students. The school was first situated at Tumahourangi Marae on the shores of Lake Rotorua. When the school was moved to new facilities on Russell Rd, it gave Te Koutu an opportunity to expand and to increase the student roll. During these times a newly faced principal by the name of Uenuku Fairhall was going to grow the school from the new grounds up.

Roll
Te Kura o Te Koutu has a relatively small number of students ranging from 200 to 230. The school excels in sport, cultural activities and Spanish.

Te Koutu houses (Rahinga)
 "Pareterā"
 "Kārenga"
 "Te Ririu"
 "Waoku"
 "Hinekura"

The houses are named after the five Kuia (elderly woman) of the rohe.

References 

Schools in Rotorua
Kura Kaupapa Māori schools
Educational institutions established in 1993
1993 establishments in New Zealand